Greenland is a surname. Notable people with the surname include:

Colin Greenland (born 1954), English writer
Emma Jane Greenland (1760-1843), English painter, writer, singer
Sander Greenland (born 1951), American statistician and epidemiologist
Seth Greenland, American writer
Susan Kaiser Greenland (born 1956), American writer